"Goin' Against Your Mind" is a song recorded by the American rock band Built to Spill for their sixth studio album, You in Reverse (2006). It was released as the lead single from You in Reverse on January 17, 2006 through Warner Bros. Records.

Background
The song originated during a jam session between the band members, at half the speed of the recorded iteration. Martsch changed the tempo with the Wipers in mind. The band first shared the song during live performances in 2005. The band debuted the studio version streaming on MySpace in January 2006. It was later made available for sale digitally on February 14.

Reception
"Goin' Against Your Mind" has received wide acclaim from contemporary music critics. Pitchfork named it one of the top tracks of its year, with columnist Matthew Murphy writing, "Packed tight with overlapping riffs and melodies, this track is likely to stand as one of Built to Spill's definitive creations, and is undiminished by the fact that little else on You in Reverse is quite able to match its heights." Nina Corcoran, writing for Consequence, called it "one of a kind", writing, "In almost nine minutes, Doug Martsch, Brett Nelson, Scott Plouf, and Jim Roth gear up for a fierce tackling of childhood memories, mental strength, and retaliation, all illustrated by spacious chords and heavy downbeats." Guitar.com reviewer Owen Bailey called it a "nine-minute long, hypnotic two-chord tour de force [...] Driven along by the propulsive Krautrock-esque drums of Scott Plouf, it encapsulates the record’s free spirit and showcases the varied, intertwining styles of its players." Marc Vera from Entertainment Weekly wrote that the track "finds them in perfect form, with some sliding guitar twangs and the indie power chords I've grown to love."

The Strokes guitarist Albert Hammond Jr. praised the song, calling it an "amazing nine-minute epic."

Personnel

Musicians
Doug Martsch - vocals, guitar, keyboards, percussion, co-producer
Jim Roth - guitar
Brett Nelson - bass
Scott Plouf - drums, percussion

Additional musicians
Steven Wray Lobdell - co-producer, mixing, engineer, guitar, piano, vibraphone, and percussion 
Brett Netson - guitar
Gavin Lurssen – mastering
Jacob Hall – mixing, engineer

References

2006 songs
2006 singles
Built to Spill songs